Rowing is the oldest intercollegiate sport in the United States. The first intercollegiate race was a contest between Yale and Harvard in 1852. In the 2018–19 school year, there were 2,340 male and 7,294 female collegiate rowers (on 57 and 148 teams, respectively) in Divisions I, II and III, according to the NCAA. The sport has grown since the first NCAA statistics were compiled for the 1981–82 school year, which reflected 2,053 male and 1,187 female collegiate rowers (on 48 and 43 teams, respectively) in the three divisions.  Some concern has been raised that some recent female numbers are inflated by non-competing novices.

Men's rowing has organized collegiate championships in various forms since 1871. The Intercollegiate Rowing Association (IRA) has been the de facto national championship for men since 1895.  Women's rowing initially competed in its intercollegiate championships as part of the National Women's Rowing Association Championship in 1971. From 1980 through 1996, the women's national championships races were conducted at the National Collegiate Rowing Championships in Cincinnati.  In the 1996–97 season, most women's intercollegiate rowing programs elected to join the NCAA as a "Championship" sport.  Men's rowing declined to join the NCAA, but virtually all colleges abide by NCAA regulations.  Other governing bodies of college rowing in the United States include the American Collegiate Rowing Association (ACRA).

History

Timeline

1852 – Yale challenges Harvard to a rowing race and the first Harvard-Yale Boat Race is held. This is also the first intercollegiate event held in the United States. Since 1864 this race has been held annually and since 1878, with few exceptions, it has been raced on the Thames River in New London, Connecticut.
1864 – Rowing became the first organized sport at Rutgers. Six-mile races were held on the Raritan River among six-oared boats.
1870 – The Rowing Association of American Colleges was established by Bowdoin, Brown and Harvard Universities and Massachusetts Agricultural College, now known as the University of Massachusetts Amherst. The first regatta was held on July 21, 1871, at Ingleside, Massachusetts, on the Connecticut River. This can be considered to be the very first collegiate athletic organization in the country and devised a primary rule of eligibility: that only undergraduate students should be eligible to represent their college in the regatta—a rule which remains in the NCAA to this day.
1870 – Rutgers held its first intercollegiate competition on the Raritan River against the Lawrence Scientific School of Harvard, the then top-ranked amateur crew of the time. The distance of the course was three miles.
1872 – Princeton's first intercollegiate race, at the National Amateur Regatta, Philadelphia.
1875 – Wellesley College established the first women's rowing program.
1878 – Columbia wins the Visitors' Challenge Cup and becomes the first foreign crew to win at the Henley Royal Regatta.
1891 – The Intercollegiate Rowing Association was founded by Cornell, Columbia, and Pennsylvania: its first annual regatta was hosted on June 24, 1895. Today Navy and Syracuse are also members of the association. Cornell dominates the early regattas winning 14 of the first 23 varsity 8 races.
1903 – The University of Washington established a men's and women's rowing program, and beat the University of California in their first dual.

1908 – Princeton completes the construction of Lake Carnegie, the gift of Andrew Carnegie, as its rowing venue.
1916 – Lightweight rowing was first introduced at the University of Pennsylvania.
1920 – Navy wins the gold medal at the 1920 Summer Olympics in the eight-man (8+) boat.  US collegiate boats would win the gold medal in the 8+ at the next seven Olympics.
1922 – The first Harvard-Yale-Princeton lightweight race is held on May 20.
1923 – Washington is the first team from the west coast to win the varsity 8 title at the IRA regatta.  Between 1920 and 1950, California, Navy and Washington would dominate college rowing winning 21 of the 25 varsity titles at the IRA and five Olympic titles in the eight-man boat.
1924 – Yale varsity men's 8 wins Olympic gold in Paris
1928 – The University of California varsity men's 8 wins the Olympic gold medal in Amsterdam.
1932 – The University of California varsity men's 8 wins its second Olympic gold medal in Los Angeles.
1936 – Washington varsity men's 8 wins Olympic gold in Berlin, Germany at the 'Nazi games'.
1946 – The Eastern Association of Rowing Colleges (EARC) is formed and the first Eastern Sprints is held for lightweights and heavyweights.
1948 – The University of California varsity men's 8 wins its third Olympic gold at Henley in London.*1956 – Yale varsity men's 8 wins Olympic gold in Melbourne Australia
1948 – Princeton becomes the first American lightweight crew to win a championship at Henley (the Thames Cup).
1963 – Harry Parker becomes coach of Harvard.
1971 – Collegiate women begin competing in the eight-oared boat (8+) at the National Women's Rowing Association (NWRA) Championship (collegiate and non-collegiate).
1972 – Congress passes Title IX, which eventually leads to large growth in women's rowing.
1973 – Radcliffe College women's rowing team wins NWRA National Championship.
1973 – Princeton women's eight wins New England Intercollegiate Regatta championship (forerunner to EAWRC Women's Eastern Sprints).
1975 – The University of Wisconsin women's rowing team wins NWRA National Championship. 
1976 – The Yale women's rowing team strips in front of the Yale athletic director to demand equal opportunity under Title IX. The incident makes national headlines.  The documentary film, A Hero for Daisy, memorializes this event.
1976 – First EAWRC Varsity Women's Lightweight 8 championship, won by Boston University,
1979 – Yale women's team claims its first national championship as top college finisher at NWRA regatta.
1980 – The first Women's National Collegiate Rowing Championship is held at Oak Ridge, Tennessee, sponsored by the National Women's Rowing Association (NWRA).
1982 – The only Association for Intercollegiate Athletics for Women (AIAW) rowing championships was held
1983 – Boston University women's rowing team wins National Championship for a third time.
1986 – The National Women's Rowing Association (NWRA) dissolves and USRowing assumes responsibility as the national governing body for women's rowing.
1988 – Northeastern University Men's 8+ capture school's first IRA Championship at Lake Onondaga, NY
1997 – The NCAA establishes a rowing championship for women. Washington sweeps the NCAA Regatta and IRA Regatta.
2002 – The University of California Men's 8 wins its fourth straight IRA gold medal (1999, 2000, 2001, 2002), the first four-peat since Cornell (1955–1958).
2009 – Washington Sweeps the 8+ Events at the IRA Regatta, becoming the first crew to do so since they did in 1997. They won in the Varsity 8, Second Varsity 8, Freshman 8, and open four and placed second in the Varsity 4
2010 – The University of California Men's 8 wins gold at the IRAs, its sixth in 12 years and 16th overall, second only to Cornell's 22 titles.
2011 – Washington's men's 8 wins gold at the IRAs for the 14th time.
2012 – Washington's men achieve an unprecedented sweep of all five grand finals at the IRAs, setting record times in 2V8, freshmen 8, V4, and open 4, as well as its 15th V8 IRA title.

Categories

Men's rowing
Men's rowing is not affiliated with the National Collegiate Athletic Association.  The de facto national championship of Division I men's rowing is the Intercollegiate Rowing Association (IRA) Championships. The National Champion in each category is the winner of its respective Varsity 8+ race. The Dad Vail Regatta is considered the national championship for second-tier schools. These include top club teams such as Virginia and Michigan as well as lower level varsity programs such as Hobart and St. Joseph's University. Other club programs and all programs outside the NCAA/IRA structure compete at the ACRA National Championship Regatta.

In collegiate men's rowing, the First Varsity 8 is meant to be the fastest boat.  Oarsmen not selected for the First Varsity 8 are usually placed in the Second Varsity 8 followed by the Third Varsity. Rowers outside of the top two eights are sometimes, depending on the race, put into fours of various categories.  This is the case at the IRA championship, for example, but not at the Eastern Sprints or Pac-10 championship. Freshman separately competed in the Freshman 8, the Second Freshman 8, a Freshman 4, etc., until 2012 when the IRA permitted freshman eligibility to row in a varsity boat; most leagues followed suit. The IRA eliminated freshman races after 2015.

Women's rowing
NCAA women's rowing is divided into three divisions with an official NCAA championship:
NCAA Division I Rowing Championship
NCAA Division II Rowing Championship
NCAA Division III Rowing Championship

Women rowers compete at the NCAA Division I Rowing Championship in a Varsity 8, a Second Varsity 8, and a Varsity Four.  Most teams also field one or more Novice Eights for novice rowers who have never competed at the collegiate level. Points are awarded for the overall championship based on the performance of those boats.  Other head races and regattas such as Head of the Charles or the Pac-12 Championships allow a wide variety of competition in less-prominent boat classifications such as pair, sculls, and lightweight racing.

There has been spectacular growth in women's rowing over the past 25 years.  In 1985, the FISA and Olympic course distance for women was increased from 1,000 meters to 2,000 meters (the same distance raced by men), marking progress in public perception of women's strength, endurance and competitive drive.  Universities that have never had a men's team have added women's rowing to the athletic department and are providing funding and athletic scholarships for the expensive and demanding sport, contributing to a noticeable increase in the success and competitiveness of many collegiate women's rowing teams. This, in part, is to comply with Title IX; many of the football powers use women's rowing to help balance out the large number of scholarships awarded to male football players. As a result, many women's college rowers have not previously competed at high school or for a club team.

Lightweight rowing
When Canadian sculler Joseph Wright began coaching at Penn in 1916, he discovered that he had a number of smaller but excellent oarsmen.  His idea of creating a crew composed entirely of these lighter weight rowers—averaging 150 pounds per man—quickly spread to other institutions, and by 1919 the American Rowing Association officially recognized competition in lightweight rowing by 150-pounders in eight-oared shells. The initial weight difference between lightweights and heavyweights of that era—about 20 pounds—was not particularly substantial.  In fact, lightweight rowers weights were much closer to the heavyweight crews of that era than they are now. For men, the maximum weight is currently 160 lbs. For women, the weight limit is 130 lbs.

Rowers must propel the weight of their equipment and coxswain as well as their own weight down the race course.  The weight of equipment and coxswain is roughly the same for heavyweights and lightweights.  As a generalization, the greater the strength, endurance and perseverance of a rower—as compared to the total weight he or she must propel down the course—the greater the speed.  In rowing, taller individuals have a leverage advantage, and, as a rule, heavier individuals tend to have more absolute strength to allocate not only to themselves but also to the weight of the equipment and coxswain.  A top heavyweight boat will thus be faster than a top lightweight boat, but a top lightweight boat will be faster than many heavyweight boats.  For example, the winning lightweight men's 8 at the 2015 to 2019 IRAs was faster than the finals time for all but 6 to 12 heavyweights 8s.

There are races for both men's and women's lightweight rowing. However, many of the smaller colleges have limited sized programs and simply field open weight boats, which include rowers who would qualify as lightweights, and many larger Division I-A universities, cognizant of Title IX issues, have limited the size of their men's programs. This is especially apparent in the west, where California Lightweight Crew remains one of the few programs for men's lightweight rowing in that region.

However, on the east coast, most Ivy League and EARC schools have well-populated, excellent, fast and well-funded men's lightweight teams. The lightweight men's events at the Eastern Sprints and the Intercollegiate Rowing Association Championship (IRAs) are fiercely contested. For example, the time difference between the first and sixth lightweight men's varsity 8 at the 2019 IRAs was only 1.7 seconds—less than half a length.  Since the NCAA Rowing Championships does not have a lightweight event for women, a select number of these teams (e.g., University of Wisconsin) are eligible to compete at IRAs.

Olympic rowing introduced lightweight event categories for the first time at the 1996 Atlanta Games.

Freshman/novice rowing
Since rowing is such a technical sport, there is a separate category for novices (rowers with less than one year of experience).  This is usually combined with freshman rowers, who may have rowed before in high school, but are in their first year in collegiate rowing.  The Freshman squad is sometimes open only to college freshmen.  However, people who start rowing after their freshman year normally join the novice team as well.  The novice squad usually fields a freshman eight-oared boat (8+), and if the team is big enough, a second eight, and/or a four-oared boat (4+).  In some collegiate conferences excluding the EARC and Intercollegiate Rowing Association (IRA), collegiate freshmen/novice can also compete as part of the varsity squad.  At the 2012 IRA Steward's annual meeting it was voted to repeal the ban on freshmen competing as part of their varsity squad.  In the league the term 'First Year Collegiate Rower' will now be used to describe Freshmen/Novice rowing.

Annual calendar
Rowing is one of the few collegiate sports where athletes practice year round and compete during both spring and fall. In addition many athletes train at various rowing clubs around the country during the summer.

Fall
In the fall, most schools focus on building technical proficiency and improving physical strength and endurance.  This is typically accomplished through long steady practice pieces, with occasional shorter interval pieces.  In the United States fall is also the season of head races which are typically between three and six kilometers. These longer races are part of the foundation for the spring season, building the rower's endurance and mental toughness. The largest fall race is the Head of the Charles Regatta held in Boston each October. This race includes rowers of all ages, abilities, and affiliations and features the best college crews in competition with Olympic-level athletes from the United States and other countries. The largest collegiate-only regatta in the fall is the Princeton Chase, typically in early November on Lake Carnegie in Princeton, New Jersey, and hosted by Princeton University. Also held in late fall, Rutgers hosts the Rutgers Fall Classic for collegiate first-year and novice crews on the Raritan River in New Brunswick, New Jersey.

Winter
This is an intense building period for the spring racing season. The training regimen consists primarily of long interval training, which gradually becomes shorter and more intense as the race season approaches.  This is done on the water for schools below the snowline.  And for some of the northern colleges that practice on lakes and rivers which are frozen during winter, these pieces are done using ergometers and, if the college is lucky enough to have them, rowperfect rowing simulators and indoor rowing tanks. Additionally, most schools, regardless of whether they have water to row on, do ergometer testing (all out maximum performance test), weights, stadium stairs and long runs. A few colleges and universities send their fastest rowers to the CRASH-B Sprints in Boston. This 2,000 meter race is held on ergometers and features separate events for collegiate athletes. Many northeastern colleges have a winter training trip to a warmer state such as Florida, Georgia, North Carolina, Louisiana, South Carolina, Tennessee and Texas during either winter break or spring break to give students extra time on the water while the local rivers and lakes are frozen.

Spring
Spring is the primary season for college rowing, and the majority of the schedule is composed of dual races. These 2,000-meter races take place between two, or sometimes three, schools. The winner of these races usually receive shirts from the losing teams.

There are also several large regattas, such as the Dad Vail Regatta, Eastern Sprints, Knecht Cup, and the San Diego Crew Classic which may be on the schedule. In this case, the teams compete in either flights, in which the winner is final, or a series of heats and semifinals before the winners move on to the finals. Sprint races begin with all teams lined up and started simultaneously, as opposed to the time trials in the fall.

Performing well in these races is the most important selection criteria for the various post season invitation rowing championships.  If the crew is in a league, the dual race and regatta results will also typically be used in determining the team's seeding for the league championship. The Dad Vail Regatta is the largest and most prestigious for smaller schools and is held every May in Philadelphia.
 
The lightweight division becomes more prominent during the spring. Many head races lack separate categories for heavyweight/lightweight, but many spring races have a separate weight category for lighter rowers.

National championships

Men's
The Intercollegiate Rowing Association, known as the IRA, was founded by Cornell, Columbia, and Penn in 1894 and its first annual regatta was hosted on June 24, 1895.  Today Navy and Syracuse are also members of the association. Each year these five schools choose whom to invite to the regatta and are responsible for its organization along with the ECAC. The IRA is the oldest college rowing championship in the United States.

Since the 1920s, when the West Coast crews, notably California and University of Washington began to attend and regularly win, most crews considered the Intercollegiate Rowing Association's championship to be a de facto national championship. Two important crews, Harvard and Yale, however, did not participate in the heavyweight divisions of the event. After losing to Cornell in 1897, Harvard and Yale chose to avoid the IRA, so as not to diminish the Harvard-Yale race. It soon became part of each school's tradition not to go.  Beginning in 1973, Washington decided to skip the IRA because a change in schedule conflicted with its finals.

Even though rowing is the oldest intercollegiate sport, the men have always chosen not to join the NCAA.  If they did, the NCAA would sponsor a championship, but it would also force the sport to abide by NCAA rules and mandates.  Notwithstanding, collegiate crews generally abide by NCAA rules, and they also have to abide by athletic conference rules, which mirror the NCAA rules.

In 1982, a Harvard alumnus decided to remedy this perceived problem by establishing a heavyweight varsity National Collegiate Rowing Championship race in Cincinnati, Ohio.  It paid for the winners of the Pac-10 Championship, the Eastern Sprints, the IRA and the Harvard-Yale race to attend.  It was a finals only event and other crews could attend if they paid their own way and there was room in the field.  The winner received an expense paid trip to the Henley Royal Regatta as a prize.  After 1996, however, the race was discontinued.

Given Washington's return to the IRA in 1995 and the demise of the National Collegiate Rowing Championship, the IRA again was considered to be the national championship.  In 2003, Harvard and Yale, after an absence of over one hundred years, decided to participate.

For men's rowing the Dad Vail Regatta in Philadelphia is considered the national championship for smaller college teams unable to compete at the IRA standard (similar to Division III or I-AA in other sports). It is the largest collegiate race in the nation.

Starting in 2008, club crews (non-Varsity programs) were no longer allowed to participate in the IRA Regatta, and the ACRA National Championship Regatta is considered the National Championship for collegiate club programs and all programs outside the NCAA/IRA structure. Unlike most collegiate sports, club-level crews regularly compete against Varsity programs and are often competitive.

Qualification 
As of 2018, qualification for the National Championship Regatta comes from automatic qualifying positions at the three major rowing conference championships, three National Regattas, and at-large bids. The automatic qualification bids are assigned as:

 Eastern Association of Rowing Colleges: Eastern Sprints (Top Nine Eligible IRA Finishers)
 Pac-12 Conference: Pac-12 Championships (Top Three Eligible IRA Finishers)
 Western Sprints: Western Sprints Championships (Top Two Eligible IRA Finishers)
 Southern Intercollegiate Rowing Association: SIRA Regatta (Top One Eligible IRA Finisher)
 Dad Vail Regatta: (Top One Eligible IRA Finisher)
 National Invitational Rowing Championships: (Top One Eligible IRA Finisher)

Typically, there are a total of 24 entries with the above 17 entries granted as automatic qualification bids. The remaining 7 entries are selected by the IRA in the weeks following the conclusion of all qualifying regattas.

The IRA awards the Varsity Challenge Cup to the men's heavyweight national championship 8, the 1922 Trophy to the men's lightweight national championship 8, and the Camden County Freeholders Trophy to the women's lightweight national championship 8.  The IRA also awards the Ten Eyck Trophy to the university amassing the largest number of points in three of the four possible eights from each school.

Women's
Between 1967 and 1980, women's collegiate boats entered the National Women's Rowing Association National Championships (what is now the USRowing National Championships). The college boats raced against club boats, including boats from outside the United States.  The best finishing US collegiate boat was deemed to be the National Champion.

The first women's collegiate championship was held in 1980 at Oak Ridge, Tennessee. This race was open solely to collegiate rowing teams.

Since 1997, the NCAA has hosted an invitational rowing championship for women. Unlike the former women's collegiate championship, the NCAA does not have a championship race for women's lightweight rowing.  In response, the IRA hosts a women's lightweight event.

The NCAA currently hosts championships for Division I, Division II and Division III colleges, with Divisions II and III having been added in 2002.

NCAA Division I requires colleges to enter two eight-oared shells and one four-oared shell in the team championship. The championship is restricted to eleven conference champions (American, ACC, A10, Big Ten, Big 12, CAA, Ivy, MAAC, Pac-12, Patriot, and WCC) as automatic qualifiers and eleven at-large schools for a total of twenty-two teams. The at-large teams are selected by the NCAA Division I Women's Rowing Committee. The NCAA Division II championship consists of an eight-oared shells and four-oared shell competition. The Division III championship involved both varsity and second varsity eights competing in the same event until 2012. Beginning in 2013, the V-1 and V-2 boats compete in separate events.

NCAA Conferences (women's teams)

American Athletic Conference
The American Athletic Conference is the legal successor of the original Big East Conference, founded in 1979, and retains the charter of the original Big East. The original conference split along football lines in 2013, with the seven non-FBS schools purchasing the "Big East" name and joining with three other schools to form a new Big East. This new conference did not have enough rowing schools to sponsor that sport; one of those schools, Villanova, became a rowing-only affiliate of The American. Villanova rowing would eventually join the CAA, already home to the school's football team, starting with the 2015–16 season.

Two of the schools that reorganized as The American, Louisville and Rutgers, spent only the 2013–14 school year in that conference; they respectively joined the ACC and Big Ten in July 2014. Tulsa joined from Conference USA at the same time. The American announced in March 2014 that California State University, Sacramento (more commonly called Sacramento State) and San Diego State University would join as associate members for women's rowing only, beginning in the 2014–15 season. Another associate was added for the 2018–19 school year in Old Dominion University, previously a rowing-only member of the Big 12 Conference.

The University of South Florida announced in 2016 that the NCAA had approved its request to start a Division I women's rowing team which it hopes to be ready for the 2018–19 school year. The rowing team was to be based at the USF Sarasota-Manatee Campus and compete in the American Athletic Conference. USF is an all-sports member of The American. However, USF ultimately never added the sport at the varsity level.

A more recent change to The American's rowing roster came in July 2020 when UConn left to rejoin many of its former conference rivals in the current Big East. With the Big East not sponsoring rowing, UConn moved that sport to the Colonial Athletic Association. A year later, San Diego State dropped women's rowing, citing financial impacts from COVID-19.

Atlantic Coast Conference
The Atlantic Coast Conference first held a rowing championship in 2000 with Clemson, Duke, North Carolina, and Virginia participating. The 2005 conference realignment cycle brought two rowing schools into the ACC, with Miami and Boston College respectively joining for the 2005 and 2006 seasons. Further realignment in the early 2010s brought three more rowing schools into the conference. Notre Dame and Syracuse joined the ACC in 2013, with Louisville joining the following year.

Atlantic 10 Conference
The Atlantic 10 Conference (A10) first held a rowing championship in 1996 with 10 schools participating. Today, nine schools participate.

Big Ten Conference
The Big Ten Conference hosted its first Big Ten Women's Rowing Championship in 2000. Currently seven schools compete in both the Championship Regatta and annual "Double Duals" races consisting of contests between 2–3 Big Ten competitors. The Big Ten is one of the dominant conferences in women's collegiate rowing, with at least one school being selected to compete at the NCAA Rowing Championships every year since its inception.

The Big Ten rowing league expanded to eight members in 2014 when Rutgers joined the conference.

Big 12 Conference
The history of Big 12 Conference women's rowing is intertwined with the rowing history of Conference USA (C-USA).

The Big 12 contested its first rowing championship in 2008 (2007–08 school year), initially with Kansas, Kansas State, and Texas. Oklahoma joined the following year. In July 2012, West Virginia joined the conference for all sports, bringing the number of rowing schools to five.

In the meantime, C-USA held its first rowing championship in 2010 (2009–10 school year). The Big 12 and C-USA agreed that the four Big 12 schools that then sponsored the sport would also participate in the C-USA championship. These schools were joined by the three full C-USA members that sponsored the sport (SMU, Tulsa, and UCF) and two Southeastern Conference members (Alabama and Tennessee). Alabama did not participate in the 2011 C-USA tournament because of the massive tornado that hit its home city of Tuscaloosa. West Virginia joined the Big 12 in 2012, also joining C-USA women's rowing at that time. Also in 2012, Old Dominion moved five of its sports, including women's rowing, from the CAA to C-USA in advance of that school's 2013 entry into full C-USA membership.

As a result of the 2013 split of the original Big East Conference, SMU and UCF both left C-USA for that league's football-sponsoring offshoot, the American Athletic Conference, in 2013, and Tulsa made the same move a year later. C-USA added two new rowing affiliates for the 2013–14 season in Sacramento State and San Diego State, but both left after that season for The American. The rapid turnover in rowing membership presumably led the Big 12 to take over the C-USA women's rowing league, with the three remaining C-USA rowing schools (Alabama, Old Dominion, Tennessee) becoming Big 12 affiliates.

Old Dominion left Big 12 rowing after the 2017–18 season for the American Athletic Conference.

Colonial Athletic Association
The Colonial Athletic Association began official sponsorship of women's rowing as the conference's 23rd sport in March 2009. Previously, the conference championships were held unofficially as the Kerr Cup, hosted by Drexel University. The first CAA women's rowing championship was conducted on April 18, 2009 in Philadelphia with races in the Varsity 4+, Second Varsity 8+, and Varsity 8+. The event was conducted in conjunction with the Kerr Cup on the Schuylkill River along historic Boathouse Row. The most recent championship in May 2021 was held on the Cooper River in Pennsauken, New Jersey.  Three full CAA members currently sponsor women's rowing at the intercollegiate level—the University of Delaware, Drexel University, and Northeastern University; they are joined by four associate members in Eastern Michigan University, the University of California, San Diego, the University of Connecticut, and Villanova University.

Ivy League 
Ivy League women's teams:

Metro Atlantic Athletic Conference
The Metro Atlantic Athletic Conference (MAAC) is a college athletic conference which operates in the northeastern United States. The conference championships are held during the end of April at Cooper River Park in New Jersey.

PAC-12
University of Washington,
Washington State University,
Oregon State University,
Stanford University,
University of California - Berkley,
University of California - Los Angeles,
University of Southern California

Patriot League

West Coast Conference
The West Coast Conference first held a women's rowing championship in 1997 with five of the league's eight members at that time participating—Gonzaga, Loyola Marymount, Saint Mary's, San Diego, and Santa Clara. Creighton became a WCC associate member starting with the 2011 championship, and longtime WCC member Portland added a varsity rowing team the following season.

Eastern Colleges Athletic Conference/Metro League
The ECAC/Metro League is a women's rowing conference.

The participating schools are: Buffalo, Colgate, Delaware, Fordham, UMass, New Hampshire, Rhode Island, Villanova, and West Virginia. Most of these schools have dual conference memberships in rowing.

Other conferences

Eastern Association of Rowing Colleges
The Eastern Association of Rowing Colleges (EARC) was formed in 1946. It is a men's rowing conference composed of the Ivy League schools plus other select universities. Each year the EARC schools race at the Eastern Sprints regatta on Lake Quinsigamond in Massachusetts, which, for the men, is generally considered the most important race of the year aside from the IRA.

The EARC men's lightweight team which attains the highest points for the Freshman 8+, Second Varsity 8+ (JV), and First Varsity 8+ are awarded the Jope Cup.

On the women's side, the conference is called the Eastern Association of Women's Rowing Colleges (EAWRC). The Women's Eastern Sprints, held on the Cooper River in Camden, New Jersey, are highly competitive, on a similar level of competitiveness as the Aramark Central Region Championships and Pac-12 Championships.

The Eastern Sprints also serve as the Ivy League Championship, with the best-placed boat from an Ivy League school being crowned Ivy League Champion.

Mid-Atlantic Rowing Conference
Prior to the formation of the Mid-Atlantic Rowing Conference, the nine charter member schools—Bryn Mawr College, Franklin & Marshall College, Johns Hopkins University, Marietta College, the University of Mary Washington, North Park University, Richard Stockton College, Rutgers University–Camden, and Washington College—enjoyed an affiliation due to their annual competition at the Mid-Atlantic Division III Rowing Championships, formerly the Atlantic Collegiate League Sprints Championships. In late 2008, the rowing programs at the nine schools expressed a common desire to formalize their association in order to enhance the student-athlete experience for their rowers. From that desire, the Mid-Atlantic Rowing Conference was born in January 2009 and the Mid-Atlantic Division III Rowing Championships became the Mid-Atlantic Rowing Conference Championships.

New England Small College Athletic Conference
This conference has been in the northeast as a collection of DIII schools for a long time.  The NESCAC Division III Rowing Teams us the New England Intercollegiate Rowing Championships as their conference championship.

Northwest Collegiate Rowing Conference
The Northwest Collegiate Rowing Conference consists of seven NCAA Division II and III member schools in USRowing's Northwest region.  The Conference hosts two major regattas each year.  The NCRC Invite takes place during late-March on Vancouver Lake, Washington and has welcomed non-conference members from California, Oregon, and Washington.  Conference championships are annually held the third weekend of April at the Cascade Sprints Regatta on Lake Stevens, Washington.

Sunshine State Conference
The Sunshine State Conference consists of six NCAA Division II member schools in USRowing's Southeast region.  The Conference hosts two major regattas each year.  The SSC double duals takes place during late-March with the venue rotating between member schools hosting, and has welcomed non-conference members from the south.  Conference championships are annually held the third weekend of April at the Nathan Benderson Park on Nathan Benderson Park, Florida.

Western Intercollegiate Rowing Association
The Western Intercollegiate Rowing Association (WIRA) is an American collegiate conference that sponsors men's and women's rowing.

Olympic medals won by U.S. collegiate boats
Up until the 1968 Summer Olympics, the United States had a trial system to pick the boats that would represent the United States in the Olympics. The top boats in the country, both collegiate and club, would participate in the Olympic Trials after the end of the collegiate calendar.

With the exception of 1964, a college boat won every Olympics Trials in the eight-oared boat (8+) from 1920 through 1968—and all of the boats from 1920 through 1956 won gold medals. College boats also have had some success in the four-man events (4+) and (4-) and the pair (2-).

Beginning in 1972, the United States has chosen its eight from a national selection camp.  Numerous college athletes have made Olympic boats, but they were not specifically representing their University either at the camp, or at the Olympic trials for some of the smaller boats.

Below is a list of college boats that represented the United States at the Olympics:

Coxed eight (8+)

Olympic gold medals 
 1920 Summer Olympics Brussels—United States Naval Academy
 1924 Summer Olympics Paris—Yale University
 1928 Summer Olympics Amsterdam—University of California
 1932 Summer Olympics Los Angeles—University of California
 1936 Summer Olympics Berlin—University of Washington
 1948 Summer Olympics London—University of California
 1952 Summer Olympics Helsinki—United States Naval Academy
 1956 Summer Olympics Melbourne—Yale University

Other Olympic eight-man boats 
 1960 Summer Olympics Rome—United States Naval Academy (5th Place)
 1968 Summer Olympics Mexico City—Harvard University (6th Place)

Coxed fours (4+) 
 1928 Summer Olympics Amsterdam—Harvard University (eliminated)
 1948 Summer Olympics London, Gold Medal – University of Washington
 1952 Summer Olympics Helsinki, Bronze Medal – University of Washington
 1964 Summer Olympics Tokyo—Harvard University (eliminated)
 1968 Summer Olympics Mexico City—University of Pennsylvania (5th Place)

Coxless fours (4-) 
 1948 Summer Olympics London, Bronze Medal – Yale University
 1952 Summer Olympics Helsinki, United States Naval Academy (eliminated)

Coxless pairs (2-) 
 1948 Summer Olympics London – Yale University (eliminated)
 1952 Summer Olympics Helsinki, Gold Medal – Rutgers University

References